Alex White (born 7 October 1983) is a South African rower. She competed in the women's lightweight double sculls event at the 2008 Summer Olympics.

References

External links
 
 

1983 births
Living people
South African female rowers
Olympic rowers of South Africa
Rowers at the 2008 Summer Olympics
Place of birth missing (living people)